Dustin Gazley (born October 3, 1988) is an American professional ice hockey forward who is currently playing for HC Bolzano in the ICE Hockey League (ICEHL).

Playing career
Undrafted, Gazley played collegiate hockey for Michigan State in the Central Collegiate Hockey Association from 2007 through 2011.

He made his professional debut with Greenville Road Warriors of the ECHL to end the 2010–11 season, before later making his American Hockey League (AHL) debut with the Binghamton Senators during the 2012–13 season.

On August 7, 2013, Gazley signed an initial one-year AHL contract with the Hershey Bears.

After his fifth season with the Bears in 2017–18, and having enjoyed a 278-game career in the AHL, Gazley left as a free agent to sign his first contract abroad, agreeing to a one-year deal with Austrian outfit, EC Red Bull Salzburg, of the EBEL on July 12, 2018.

Career statistics

Awards and honors

References

External links

1988 births
Living people
American men's ice hockey forwards
Binghamton Senators players
Bolzano HC players
Elmira Jackals (ECHL) players
Greenville Road Warriors players
Hershey Bears players
Michigan State Spartans men's ice hockey players
Mora IK players
Reading Royals players
EC Red Bull Salzburg players
Sioux City Musketeers players
People from Novi, Michigan
Ice hockey players from Michigan